Sriti Jha (born 26 February 1986) is an Indian actress who primarily works in Hindi television. She made her acting debut in 2007 with Dhoom Machaao Dhoom playing Malini Sharma. Jha earned wider recognition with her portrayal of   Pragya Arora in Kumkum Bhagya, which  won her various awards, including Indian Telly Award for Best Actress in a Lead Role and ITA Award for Best Actress Drama.

Jha's notable works include portraying Suhani in Shaurya Aur Suhani, Sudha/Devika in Jyoti, Jhanvi/Sia Dobriyal in Dil Se Di Dua... Saubhagyavati Bhava? and Ganga in Balika Vadhu. She has also participated in Fear Factor: Khatron Ke Khiladi 12 and Jhalak Dikhhla Jaa 10.

Early life and education
Jha was born on 26 February 1986 in Begusarai, Bihar, India. She went to live with her family in Kolkata, where they stayed for 10 years, then moved to Kathmandu, Nepal. They then moved to New Delhi, where she continued her studies at Laxman Public School. She completed her Bachelor of Arts degree in English at Sri Venkateswara College, New Delhi. She has an elder sister, Meenakshi.

Career 

Jha made her television debut in 2007 playing Malini Sharma in Disney India's teen drama Dhoom Machaao Dhoom. She went on to be a part of Jiya Jale where she played Sunaina Kotak. Jha also participated in the dance reality show Nachle Ve with Saroj Khan. In 2009, she played Suhani in Star Plus's Shaurya Aur Suhani. She rose to prominence with Jyoti on NDTV Imagine playing Sudha Sharma, a split personality patient. In 2011, she played Jhanvi Dobriyal, a victim of domestic violence in Dil Se Di Dua... Saubhagyavati Bhava?. In 2013, she played Ganga in Colors TV's Balika Vadhu. Jha received wider critical acclaim and praise after she played Pragya Mehra in Ekta Kapoor's Kumkum Bhagya opposite Shabir Ahluwalia. She became a household name with her portrayal of Pragya and won several awards. 

In 2022, she participated in Fear Factor: Khatron Ke Khiladi 12, which was being shot in Cape Town, South Africa and ended up finishing at 10th place. In the same year, she joined Jhalak Dikhhla Jaa 10 as a wildcard entry and finished at 5th place.

Off-screen work
In January 2021, Jha recited a poem, "Confessions Of An Asexual Romantic", during the 2020 Kommune India Spoken Fest, in which she spoke about how the life of an asexual might be and how there is a lack of freedom in India when it comes to talking about one's sexuality. In an interview, she clarified she is not an asexual and that the poem isn't about her. She also recited two more poems regarding people with different sexual preferences and the problems they face such as "Choodiyaan" which talks about a gay male,  and "Chaabi Gum Gai Hai", based on a lesbian female. In "It's Pehla Pyaar Every Time", she talks about how every time we fall in love, it feels as if it's the first time. 

Her other works, such as "To Like? Or To Love?" differentiate between loving and liking and how liking is free of boundaries while love is limiting. Jha's first open letter "A Letter To Myself" is about what she wants to tell her 15 year old self in the past and that we should never compromise under any circumstance. In this collaboration with ITC Vivel, Jha inspires women to uncondition, challenge stereotypes and go forth to fulfill their dreams with confidence and say out loud, "Ab Samjhauta Nahin". She also presented a poem "Cheesy Stupid Ishq" as a narrator a day before the Valentines Day in 2021.

Filmography

Films

Television

Special appearances

Accolades

See also 
 List of Hindi television actresses
 List of Indian television actresses

References

External links 

 

1986 births
Living people
Indian television actresses
 Asexual women
Actresses in Hindi television
Actresses from Bihar
Indian soap opera actresses
Actresses from Mumbai
People from Begusarai
Fear Factor: Khatron Ke Khiladi participants